"F.U.R.B. (Fuck You Right Back)" is the debut single of American R&B singer-songwriter Frankee. The song was recorded as an answer song to Eamon's hit single "Fuck It (I Don't Want You Back)". Although Frankee claimed to be Eamon's ex-girlfriend and that "Fuck It (I Don't Want You Back)" was written about her, Eamon has denied this. "F.U.R.B." peaked at number one in the United Kingdom and Australia and also entered the US Billboard Hot 100, reaching number 63. Elsewhere, the song became a top-10 hit in Denmark, Germany, Ireland, and Norway.

Background
While Eamon initially said he selected Frankee to record the song at an audition, he later stated that his only involvement was in clearing the use of the music with the following statement:

"I was not involved with 'F.U.R.B.' I have never met Frankee and she is definitely not my girlfriend or ex-girlfriend. The only way I was associated with it was when I was asked for licensing permission by Frankee's representatives, which makes me a writer on her song by copyright law. But I really didn't expect all this to come out of it, they are having fun with it, it's cool but in the end they are paying me for their 15 minutes of fame and I welcome her to my world of Ho-Wop!"

Commercial performance
Upon its release, the song debuted and peaked at number one on the UK Singles Chart with first week sales of 80,000 copies, knocking Eamon's song off from number one and became the first answer song to reach number one in the United Kingdom. It finished as the tenth best selling song of 2004 in the United Kingdom. In Australia, it also peaked at number one on the ARIA Singles Chart, again knocking Eamon's song off, becoming the twenty-seventh best selling single in Australia that year.

The song charted within the top ten in Denmark, Germany, Ireland, and Norway. However, in the United States, it was not as successful, reaching number 63 on the US Billboard Hot 100. To date, Frankee has not had another charting single, making her a one-hit wonder.

Track listings and formats

Charts and sales

Weekly charts

Year-end charts

Certifications and sales

Release history

References

2004 debut singles
2004 songs
All Around the World Productions singles
Answer songs
Contemporary R&B ballads
Epic Records singles
Number-one singles in Australia
Number-one singles in Scotland
Songs about infidelity
UK Singles Chart number-one singles